Yarmouth station may refer to:

 Yarmouth station (Massachusetts), a New York, New Haven & Hartford Railroad station in Yarmouth, Massachusetts
 Yarmouth railway station (Isle of Wight), a former station on the Isle of Wight, England
 Yarmouth Beach railway station, a former station in Norfolk, England
 Yarmouth South Town railway station, a former station in Norfolk, England

See also
 Admiral of the North, formerly Admiral on the Yarmouth Station (1294-1325)
 Great Yarmouth railway station, formerly Yarmouth Vauxhall, in Norfolk, United Kingdom